Lucyna Kałek (née Langer, born 9 January 1956) is a retired Polish hurdler. The highlights of her career in the 100 metres hurdles were winning the 1980 Olympic bronze medal and the gold medal at the 1982 European Championships. She also won the 1984 European Indoor Championships 60 metres hurdles title and was the fastest 100 metres hurdler in the world in 1984, with her career-best time of 12.43 secs.

Career
Born in Mysłowice, Langer first ran under 13 seconds for the 100 metres hurdles with 12.89 secs in 1978, improving to 12.62 in 1979, when winning the Universiade title in Mexico City. When her Polish team-mate Grazyna Rabsztyn broke the world record with 12.36 secs in June 1980, Langer finished second in 12.44, to move to second on the world all-time list. She would go on to win an Olympic bronze medal six weeks later in Moscow, running 12.65.

As Lucyna Kalek, she won the 1982 European title in Athens, in a season's best of 12.45 secs. The only woman to go faster that year was Yordanka Donkova with 12.44. Langer defeated Donkova in Athens and was ranked number one on the 1982 Track and Field News world merit rankings. She would go on to rank number one on the 1984 Track and Field News merit rankings. 1984 also saw her slightly improve her best to 12.43 secs in Hannover on 19 August, the fastest 100 metres hurdles time in the world that year, and a time that still ranks her (as of 2018) in the all-time top 20.

International competitions

1Representing Europe

References

External links
 
 
 European Championships
 European Indoor Championships

People from Mysłowice
1956 births
Living people
Polish female hurdlers
Athletes (track and field) at the 1980 Summer Olympics
Olympic athletes of Poland
Olympic bronze medalists in athletics (track and field)
European Athletics Championships medalists
Sportspeople from Silesian Voivodeship
Medalists at the 1980 Summer Olympics
Olympic bronze medalists for Poland
Universiade medalists in athletics (track and field)
Universiade gold medalists for Poland
Friendship Games medalists in athletics